Peter Lorkulah Naigow (c. 1946–14 November 2011) was a Liberian politician. He served as minister of labour and in other positions in Samuel Doe's administration. He was elected as Vice President on 19 April 1991 to the interim administration of Amos Sawyer. He resigned on 15 August 1991.

References

Year of birth missing
2011 deaths
Vice presidents of Liberia
20th-century Liberian politicians
Place of birth missing